Iotisis is a genus of deep-sea bamboo coral in the family Isididae. It is monotypic with a single species, Iotisis alba.

References

Isididae
Octocorallia genera